Ménfői úti Stadion or Alcufer Stadion is a sports venue in Gyirmót, a district of Győr, Hungary. The stadium is home to the association football side Gyirmót FC Győr. The stadium has a capacity of 4,500.

History
On 22 September 2015, the stadium was opened. The first match was played against Dunaújváros PASE.

On 25 March 2016, the first international match was played at the stadium. Hungary (U-21) hosted Israel (U-21) in the 2017 UEFA European Under-21 Championship qualification Group 4 match. The final results was a goalless draw.

The stadium was selected to host the 2021 UEFA European Under-21 Championship.

Cost
The cost of the construction was 900 million HUF.

Milestone matches

References

External links 
Magyarfutball.hu 

Football venues in Hungary